Bengawan Solo may refer to:

Bengawan Solo River, the longest river on the Indonesian island of Java and site of paleoanthropology early hominid remains
"Bengawan Solo" (song), a 1940 Indonesian song about the Javanese river by Gesang Martohartono
Bengawan Solo (1949 film), a 1949 Indonesian film directed by Jo An Djan
Bengawan Solo (1971 film), a remake of the 1949 film directed by Sofia WD, Willy Wilianto, and Bay Isbahi
Bengawan Solo (company), a baking company in Singapore